Gortnob is a rural locality (a selo) in Gerelsky Selsoviet, Tlyaratinsky District, Republic of Dagestan, Russia. The population was 199 as of 2010.

Geography 
Gortnob is located 34 km southeast of Tlyarata (the district's administrative centre) by road. Ulgeb is the nearest rural locality.

References 

Rural localities in Tlyaratinsky District